Alcidellus is an oxyconic (sharp ventered) haploceratacean ammonite from the Middle Jurassic.

Alcidellus was named as a genus buy Gerd Westermann in 1958. It is now generally seen as a subgenus of Oxycerites, differing from Oxyceratites (O) in having a broader venter with ventrolateral shoulders. The shell of Oxycerites, including O (Alcidellus) is generally smooth, essentially involute with a small umbilicus, highly compressed with flanks converging on a narrow, somewhat sharp venter. Sutures are ammonitic.

References
Notes

Publications
 An Early Bathonian Tethyan Ammonite Fauna from Argentina, by Alberto C Riccardi and Gerd E.G. Westermann. Palaeontology, Volume 42. no2, pub online 21 Nov 2003. 
 Upper Bathonian and lower Callovian ammonites from Chacay Melehue (Argentina), by Horacio Parent. Acta Palaeontologica Polonica 43, 1, 69–130. 1998. 

Middle Jurassic ammonites